Acervulariidae is an extinct family of horn coral. These stationary epifaunal suspension feeders lived during the Devonian, Silurian and Ordovician periods.

Genera
Genera within this family include:
Acervularia
Diplophyllum
Oliveria
Rhapidophyllum

Distribution
Fossils of species within this genus have been found in the Devonian of United States and in the Silurian of Canada, China, Norway, Russia, Sweden, Ukraine, United Kingdom and United States.

References

Tabulata
Prehistoric cnidarians